Spondon Flyer was a bus service in Derby, England operated by Trent Barton.

History
Until 2017 the service operated as a direct service between Derby and Spondon with a frequency of every 10 minutes and buses travelled in both directions around Spondon. Trent Barton made changes with buses operating a single one-way loop around Spondon at a reduced frequency of every 15 minutes.

Due to low passenger numbers as a result of the COVID-19 pandemic, the service was temporarily suspended in January 2021 but was reinstated in March 2021, Due to driver shortages across the Trent Barton network it was suspended again in November 2021. In July 2022, Trent Barton announced that the service would be permenantly withdrawn. The company stated that the route had been struggling to attract enough riders since before the pandemic and that it was not profitable to run.

Route 
The service ran between Spondon and Derby non-stop.

Fleet
from 2017 until the November 2021 suspension the vehicles used on Spondon Flyer were Optare SoloSR's.

References 

Bus routes in England
Transport in Derby